The Cura nagara (small nagara) is a folk drum used in the traditional music of Azerbaijan. Since it is smaller than the main nagara, it is called "cura" nagara. The diameter of its body is 300–320 mm, and its height is 340–360 mm.

References

Drums
Asian percussion instruments
Turkish musical instruments
Azerbaijani music
Azerbaijani musical instruments